Rent guarantee insurance is a form of  underwriting through which landlords can be protected against loss of rent if the lessee defaults. Globally, most firms offer this protection through regulated insurance companies, to ensure that the provider can make good on promises of payment. Normally, 'Landlord Rent Guarantee Insurance' is combined with 'Legal Assistance Insurance' whereby a landlord's legal costs of recovering rent and/or evicting a non-paying tenant are covered.

Generally, the insurance payout starts only after one month, which does not always offer landlords adequate protection, thus decreasing the supposed benefits of the coverage. It is usually a condition of such policies that landlords ensure their tenants are professionally credit-checked before handing over keys. This product was traditionally offered in the UK and has now expanded to the United States with players such as Lloyd's of London backing companies for the last 3 years.

All companies underwriting such policies in the United Kingdom must be registered by the Financial Conduct Authority.

Rent guarantee insurance is different from a Guaranteed Rent scheme, which is a service that manages a residential property in return for a fixed portion of the rent. The owner is paid his share, even if the property is empty or tenants default on the rent.

See also
 Landlords insurance

References

Types of insurance